The Watervliet Arsenal  is an arsenal of the United States Army located in Watervliet, New York, on the west bank of the Hudson River. It is the oldest continuously active arsenal in the United States, and today produces much of the artillery for the army, as well as gun tubes for cannons, mortars, and tanks. It has been a National Historic Landmark (NHL) since 1966.

The arsenal was founded on July 14, 1813 to support the War of 1812, and was designated as the Watervliet Arsenal in 1817. It occupies 142 acres (57 ha) of land, approximately 8 miles (13 km) north of Albany, New York.  The location is adjacent to the Hudson River.  The site contains manufacturing, administrative offices and storage areas. It also houses the Army's Benét Laboratories, which does product development, improvement, research, and testing for all artillery related engineering.

Tenant activities
The Arsenal has the historic Iron Building, which served as the home of the Watervliet Arsenal Museum.  However, the museum was closed on October 1, 2013 for security reasons.

Recruiting Station Albany, the headquarters of a United States Marine Corps recruiting station, is located on the Arsenal.

On 17 February 2009, the headquarters of the United States Army Recruiting Battalion Albany relocated to Watervliet Arsenal from its old location on Wolf Road.

1813–1823
The arsenal was chosen to be built at the edge of the village of Gibbonsville, directly opposite Troy, New York. It was chosen to be built there due to its key location on the Hudson River, only  from Lake Champlain,  from New York City, and a short distance via the Mohawk River to Lake Ontario. During the early stages of the War of 1812, attacks could be expected from many key ports and other locations. At the time, the Colonel of Ordnance was Decius Wadsworth; he originally designated the arsenal to produce fixed ammunition and small articles of equipment including gun carriages, drag ropes, ladles, wormers, sponges, and shot. Construction began in the summer of 1813 on fourteen buildings: south and north gun houses, a brick arsenal, two stables, a guard house, commanding officer's quarters, a woodshed, two enlisted men's quarters, a hospital and one office. The cost for the land was 2,585.

1880s
Nearly 70 years after the arsenal produced its first products, it gained national prominence when it became the Army's first large caliber cannon manufacturer in the late 1880s. During this period, production changed from the manufacturing of saddles and gun carriages to cannons. Remnants of this period are still in operation today, as evidenced by the continued use of historic Building 110, "The Big Gun Shop," for manufacturing missions. This gun shop once produced 16-inch guns and many other weapons for the United States Army Coast Artillery Corps.

1970s-present
A considerable turning point in the modernization of Watervliet Arsenal was the construction of the radial forge in the 1970s, a $7 million dollar expenditure.

See also
List of National Historic Landmarks in New York
National Register of Historic Places listings in Albany County, New York

References

External links

Government buildings completed in 1813
Infrastructure completed in 1813
Armories on the National Register of Historic Places in New York (state)
Historic American Engineering Record in New York (state)
Hudson River
Installations of the United States Army in New York (state)
National Historic Landmarks in New York (state)
New York (state) in the American Civil War
United States Army arsenals during World War II
United States Army arsenals
Research installations of the United States Army
Buildings and structures in Albany County, New York
National Register of Historic Places in Albany County, New York
Watervliet, New York